Men's synchronized 10 metre platform competition at the Beijing 2008 Summer Olympics was held on August 11 at the Beijing National Aquatics Center.

Like all other synchronized diving competitions at the Olympics, only one round of competition was held. Eight pairs of divers competed. Each pair performed six dives, with both divers from the pair diving at the same time.

Nine judges evaluated each dive, with two each judging the performance of the two divers (the execution judges) and five judges evaluating the synchronization of the pair (the synchronization judges). For each dive, four of the nine scores are ignored - the highest and lowest execution scores, and the highest and lowest synchronization scores. The remaining five scores are summed, multiplied by the dive's degree of difficulty, and then multiplied by 0.6 to get a final score for the dive.

Results

Diving at the 2008 Summer Olympics
2008
Men's events at the 2008 Summer Olympics